Townshend State Park is a state park in Townshend, Vermont.  Embedded within Townshend State Forest, the park provides a camping facility and hiking trails for accessing Bald Mountain.  The park's facilities were developed by the Civilian Conservation Corps in the 1930s, and are listed on the National Register of Historic Places for their well-preserved state.

Description
Townshend State Park is located in central Windham County, embedded within Townshend State Forest in southern Townshend. The park entrance is located on State Forest Road east of the Scott Covered Bridge, on the south side of the West River. The principal feature of the park is its campground, which provides 30 sites in a combination of tent sites, leantos, and minimally improved bare campsites. The campground has three spurs emanating from a central area, where the ranger contact station is located. The station is a pair of stone buildings connected by a gable-roofed open shelter. The building on the left houses the ranger office, while that on the right ranger housing quarters. Other CCC-built elements of the park include eight tent platforms, and a storage building originally used as a comfort facility, as well as fireplaces, a water fountain, and a concrete water tank.

Land for the park and the surrounding state forest was purchased by the state in 1912. A fire tower (since removed) was built on Bald Mountain in 1924, and a picnic area was built by the state later in the 1920s. Most of the facilities seen in the park today were built by the CCC between 1933 and 1938, with only modest alterations, replacements of some features, and the loss of a few of the original tent platforms.

Activities at the park include picnicking, hiking, camping and fishing.

See also
List of Vermont state parks
National Register of Historic Places listings in Windham County, Vermont

References

External links
 
 Townshend State Park web site

State parks of Vermont
Townshend, Vermont
Protected areas of Windham County, Vermont
Civilian Conservation Corps in Vermont
National Register of Historic Places in Windham County, Vermont
Park buildings and structures on the National Register of Historic Places in Vermont
Buildings and structures completed in 1927
Historic districts on the National Register of Historic Places in Vermont
1912 establishments in Vermont
Protected areas established in 1912